The Latvian Basketball Association (Latvian: Latvijas Basketbola Savienība), also known as LBS, is the national governing body of basketball in Latvia. It was founded in 1923 and was one of the FIBA Europe co-founders, but due to the Soviet and Nazi occupations, the federation disappeared from FIBA from 1940 to 1991. Its headquarters are located in Riga.

Tournaments organized 
Latvian Basketball Association is recognized as one of the best international tournament organizers for FIBA. Latvia has organized EuroBasket 1937, EuroBasket Women 2009, EuroBasket 2015, EuroBasket Women 2019 and will organize EuroBasket 2025. Also, Latvia has been a host for 2011 FIBA Under-19 World Championship, 2021 FIBA Under-19 Basketball World Cup and a number of other youth competitions in all age groups. In June 2019, Latvian Basketball Association, in cooperation with NBA and FIBA hosted Basketball Without Borders Europe Camp in Riga.

Local tournaments organized 
 Latvian-Estonian Basketball League 
 Latvian Basketball League 
 Latvian National Basketball League 
 Latvian Regional Basketball League 
 Latvian Women's Basketball League 
 Latvian Basketball Cup 
 LBS Open 3x3 Basketball League 
 Latvian E-Basketball League 
 Latvian Youth Basketball League

Presidents
 Fricis Ķergalvis (1923–1925)
 Roberts Plūme (1925–1935)
 Alfrēds Ivanovskis (1935–1936)
 Eduards Ceplītis (1936–1937)
 Eduards Lapiņš (1937–1940)
Edgars Ošiņš (1940–1941)
Osvalds Porietis (1942–1943)
Eduards Andersons (1943–1944)
Jānis Augusts (1944–1945)
Augusts Raubens (1945–1946)
Edgars Ošiņš (1946–1949)
Arnolds Brambergs (1949–1950)
Viesturs Baldzēns (1950–1951)
Ādolfs Runcis (1951–1956)
Miervaldis Ramāns (1956–1971)
Artūrs Punenovs (1971–1989)
 Uldis Grāvītis (1989–1992)
 Indulis Ozols (1992–1997)
 Ojārs Kehris (1997–2011)
 Valdis Voins (2011–2020)
Raimonds Vējonis (2020–Present)

(Presidents during the occupation of Latvia marked in italics)

See also
Latvia national basketball team
Latvia national women's basketball team
Latvia men's national 3x3 team

ReferencesLatvia men's national basketball team

External links

Basketball in Latvia
Basketball
1923 establishments in Latvia
Sports organizations established in 1923